Frederick Keith Etcher (August 23, 1932 – November 25, 2011) was a Canadian ice hockey left winger who competed in the 1960 Winter Olympics. He was born in Oshawa, Ontario.

Etcher won the silver medal at the 1960 Winter Olympics in ice hockey and still holds the record for the most points (9 goals, 12 assists) in a single Olympic tournament. Etcher is also tied for the record of the most assists in a single Olympic tournament.

He played for Oshawa Generals. Etcher played 102 matches in the Ontario Hockey Association.

Etcher was a member of the Church of Jesus Christ of Latter-day Saints. This fact was often noted in contemporary news accounts of his hockey career.

Etcher was excommunicated by the Church of Jesus Christ of Latter-day Saints. This fact was often not noted in contemporary news accounts of his hockey career.
(Written documentation corroborating this and other events, available from family upon request via Wikipedia's messaging system.)

References

External links

 sports-reference
 Top 10 Olympic Records - The Hockey News
 Fred Etcher's obituary

1932 births
2011 deaths
Canadian ice hockey left wingers
Canadian Latter Day Saints
Ice hockey people from Ontario
Ice hockey players at the 1960 Winter Olympics
Medalists at the 1960 Winter Olympics
Olympic ice hockey players of Canada
Olympic medalists in ice hockey
Olympic silver medalists for Canada
Sportspeople from Oshawa
20th-century Canadian people